Gregory's Four Corners Burial Ground, a cemetery established in Trumbull, Connecticut in 1761, is located on Spring Hill Road near the Monroe town line and is maintained by the Trumbull Parks Commission.

Hannah Cranna
One of the more notable graves in the graveyard, and one of the best preserved, is that of Hannah Hovey, nicknamed "Hannah Cranna", who was purported by local folklore and many residents of Monroe to be a witch. Rather than deny any of the accusations, she reportedly used her reputation to terrify those who crossed her with threats of curses.

See also
Witchcraft

Notes

References
Reverend Samuel Orcutt, A History of the Old Town of Stratford and the City of Bridgeport, Connecticut, Volume 2, Fairfield Historical Society, 1886

External links
The USGenWeb Project, Fairfield County

Trumbull, Connecticut
Cemeteries in Fairfield County, Connecticut
1761 establishments in the Thirteen Colonies